Route 66 is an adventure drama sequel series and a remake of the same name that aired on NBC from June 8 until July 6, 1993.

Plot
Nick Lewis is notified of his estranged father's death while at work (he is a steel worker in Allentown, PA)  He is informed by his father's lawyer/executor that he was left the contents of a small house.  It is then that we discover his father was Buzz Murdock, who accompanied Tod Stiles on many adventures during the first three seasons of the original 1960s series.  He was also left a vintage red C1 Corvette, which presumably his father picked up sometime after departing from Tod.

On his way back to Allentown, he picks up a wayward hitchhiker, Arthur Clark, and they begin to travel together. They find adventure by staying off the Interstates, mostly in small towns and by interacting with the people they meet there.

Cast
James Wilder....Nick Lewis
Dan Cortese....Arthur Clark

Episodes

References

External links

U.S. Route 66
1990s American drama television series
1993 American television series debuts
1993 American television series endings
NBC original programming
English-language television shows
Television series by Sony Pictures Television
Television shows set in Los Angeles